Tej leaf may refer to:
T. J. Leaf, American basketball player
Tejpatta or Bay leaf, aromatic leaf used for cooking